Emmett Jerome "Chief" Bowles (August 2, 1898 – September 3, 1959) was a Major League Baseball pitcher who played in one game for the Chicago White Sox on September 12, 1922. He faced six batters, gave up two hits, one walk, and three earned runs.

External links

1898 births
1959 deaths
Chicago White Sox players
Major League Baseball pitchers
Baseball players from Oklahoma
People from Pottawatomie County, Oklahoma